PPTS may refer to:

 Palestine Pilgrims' Text Society, a Victorian academic society
 Pulsed plasma thrusters, a type of spacecraft propulsion
 Prospective Piloted Transport System, a Russian spacecraft
 Pyridinium p-toluenesulfonate, a chemical reagent
 Point perfect transcription services

See also
 Power point (disambiguation)